Cecil G. Osborne (December 10, 1904 – February 27, 1999) was a Baptist minister and author of 13 self help books, two of which were best sellers: The Art of Understanding Yourself, published by Zondervan in 1967; and The Art of Understanding Your Mate, also published by Zondervan in 1970.

Notes

1904 births
1999 deaths
20th-century American writers
20th-century American male writers